The 2013 Aegon GB Pro-Series Barnstaple was a professional tennis tournament played on indoor hard courts. It was the sixth edition of the tournament which was part of the 2013 ITF Women's Circuit, offering a total of $75,000 in prize money. It took place in Barnstaple, United Kingdom, on 28 October–3 November 2013.

WTA entrants

Seeds 

 1 Rankings as of 21 October 2013

Other entrants 
The following players received wildcards into the singles main draw:
  Naomi Broady
  Melanie South
  Emily Webley-Smith
  Jade Windley

The following players received entry from the qualifying draw:
  Bernarda Pera
  Anna Smith
  Lina Stančiūtė
  Eva Wacanno

The following player received entry by a lucky loser spot:
  Karin Morgošová

The following player received entry by a junior exempt:
  Kateřina Siniaková

Champions

Singles 

  Marta Sirotkina def.  Kristýna Plíšková 6–7(5–7), 6–3, 7–6(8–6)

Doubles 

  Naomi Broady /  Kristýna Plíšková def.  Raluca Olaru /  Tamira Paszek 6–3, 3–6, [10–5]

External links 
 2013 Aegon GB Pro-Series Barnstaple at ITFtennis.com
  

2013 ITF Women's Circuit
2013 in English tennis
October 2013 sports events in the United Kingdom
November 2013 sports events in the United Kingdom
2013